Amrendra Kumar Pandey aka Pappu Pandey is an Indian politician who has been elected five times member of the legislative assembly from Bihar. Now He is serving Member of legislative assembly from Kuchaikote constituency of Bihar. In the 2020 general election, he defeated ex member of parliament Kali Prasad Pandey .

Political career

Pandey of JDU represents the Kuchaikote segment in the state legislative assembly of Bihar. In 2001 he become dist board chairman of Gopalganj. In the 2005 general election, he became a Member of the Legislative Assembly from Bahujan Samaj Party (BSP). Again in the 2005 election held Pandey got a ticket from Janata Dal (United) and won. In 2010 he won the election by defeating Aditya Narayan Pandey..

In 2015 he defeated ex-Member of parliament, Kali Prasad Pandey.

In 2020 general election he again defeated ex Member of parliament Kali Prasad Pandey by 20630 votes.

See also
Kuchaikote constituency

References

Year of birth missing (living people)
Living people
People from Gopalganj district, India
Bihar MLAs 2020–2025
Janata Dal (United) politicians
Bahujan Samaj Party politicians
Bihar MLAs 2005–2010
Bihar MLAs 2010–2015
Bihar MLAs 2015–2020